HHC may refer to:

Organizations
 Hai Ha Confectionery, confectionery company in Vietnam
 Headquarters and Headquarters Company (United States), a company-sized unit of the United States Army
 Hendricks Holding Company, privately held conglomerate in Beloit, Wisconsin
 Hip Hop Congress, an organization encouraging the growth of hip hop culture
 Hispanic Health Council, a Latino social well-being organization
 Hungarian Helsinki Committee, a non-governmental human rights organization based in Budapest, Hungary
 HipHopCanada, a hip-hop publishing company based in Toronto, Canada

Structures
 Harlem Hospital Center, public teaching hospital affiliated with Columbia University
 New York City Health and Hospitals Corporation, a public hospital and clinic group in New York City

Other uses
 HHC Hardenberg, a Dutch football club
 Hexahydrocannabinol, a cannabinoid derivative 
 Hereditary hemochromatosis, a genetic mutation that causes iron accumulation
 Hill hold control, a mechanism used to assist start-up of automobiles on inclines
 Hip Hop Connection, hip-hop magazine